Lina Teresia Wester (born 7 November 1992) is a Swedish ice hockey forward.

International career
Wester was selected for the Sweden women's national ice hockey team in the 2014 Winter Olympics. She played in all six games, scoring one goal.

As of 2014, Wester has also appeared for Sweden at three IIHF Women's World Championships. Her first appearance came in 2011.

Wester made one appearance for the Sweden women's national under-18 ice hockey team, at the IIHF World Women's U18 Championships, in 2010, winning a bronze medal.

Career statistics
Through 2013–14 season

References

External links
Eurohockey.com Profile
Sports-Reference Profile

1992 births
Living people
Ice hockey players at the 2014 Winter Olympics
Olympic ice hockey players of Sweden
People from Rättvik Municipality
Swedish women's ice hockey forwards
Sportspeople from Dalarna County